Stella Moroundia Morounmubo Oyedepo (sometimes Stella Dia Oyedepo; May 7, 1949 – 22 April 2019) was a Nigerian playwright. Until her death, 22 April 2019, she was the General Manager / CEO of the National Theatre, Iganmu, Lagos.

Biography
Oyedepo has written over 300 plays over the course of her career; of these, only around 30 have been published. She takes as her subject daily life and problems, and her work often addresses such themes as marriage, corruption, politics, and family life. A typical example is her 1988 play The Greatest Gift, which contrasts the life of a family destroyed by the father's drunkenness with the life of a successful family. Her 2001 play Brain Has No Gender was written for the Kwara State Ministry of Education for Women-in-Science Programme. Her first play, Our Wife is Not a Woman, was written in 1979. Oyedepo's origins are from Ondo State. She trained as a linguist, and for some time in the 1980s she served as Senior Principal Lecturer at the Kwara State College for Education in Ilorin. She has also served as director of the Kwara State Council for Arts and Culture. Many of her plays were commissioned for specific occasions. She was survived by her husband Dr. Hezekiah Bamidele Oyedepo, four children and eleven grandchildren.

References

1949 births
2019 deaths
20th-century Nigerian dramatists and playwrights
21st-century Nigerian writers
21st-century dramatists and playwrights
Writers from Ondo State
People from Kwara State
Women dramatists and playwrights
20th-century Nigerian women writers
20th-century Nigerian writers
21st-century Nigerian women writers